E33 may refer to:
 Nimzo-Indian Defense, Encyclopaedia of Chess Openings code
 HMS E33
 European route E33
 GE E33
 Duta–Ulu Klang Expressway, route E33 in Malaysia